Anja Kluge (born 9 November 1964 in Berlin) is a German rower.

References 
 
 

1964 births
Living people
East German female rowers
Rowers from Berlin
Olympic rowers of Germany
Rowers at the 1988 Summer Olympics
Olympic gold medalists for East Germany
Olympic medalists in rowing
Medalists at the 1988 Summer Olympics
World Rowing Championships medalists for East Germany
20th-century German women